Iraqi Light Armored Vehicle or International Light Armored Vehicle is an armored fighting vehicle based on the Cougar and manufactured by Force Protection Industries, BAE Systems and General Dynamics.

Nicknamed the Badger, The ILAV is based on the Cougar, which can carry ten passengers (the six wheel version can carry sixteen). The Cougar/ILAV vehicle uses a capsule design to protect the passengers and key vehicle components from mines and roadside bombs. The Badger itself costs about US$432,000. Just like other MRAPS, the Badger can be outfitted with a robotic arm for the purpose of investigating possible IEDS and UXOs.

Operational history

Iraqi Army
The Iraqi Army began to be equipped with the ILAV in 2007 and main user of the ILAV.  The Iraqi Army Second Division was one of the first unit to receive the ILAV. Members if the Division stated that the ILAV will help provider improved protection for Soldiers of the Iraqi Army.  The Eight Division received two ILAVs and training from the 555th Engineer Brigade in 2008.  Current Iraqi Army Engineers are being trained and equipped with the remote controlled arm variants.

US Army
The ILAV was delivered to Fort Jackson, South Carolina, in 2009 for training against IEDs. The ILAV is planned to be used in "Training the Trainer" program to help new operators safety drive US MRAPs.  The Department of Defense currently restricts the use of the ILAV for training only because the armor does not meet DOD requirements to be deployed in field.

Operators
 In 2007 an order for 378 was placed,+ 865 ordered by 2011.
 Fourteen ILAVs were delivered to Fort Jackson for training US Soldiers in the use of MRAPs to prevent roll over accidents.
  Peshmerga  are operating at least two vehicles as of September 2014.
 : captured

Gallery

References

External links
  Spartan Chassis Receives Order From BAE Systems for International Light Armored Vehicles 
  International Light Armored Vehicle (ILAV) 
  ILAV 1 - 60 mph Brake Stop

Armoured fighting vehicles of Iraq
Armoured fighting vehicles of the post–Cold War period
Wheeled armoured fighting vehicles
Military vehicles introduced in the 2000s
Wheeled armoured personnel carriers